Eric Butorac and Jean-Julien Rojer were the defending champions but decided not to participate together.
Butorac played alongside Bruno Soares, while Rojer partnered up with Aisam-ul-Haq Qureshi.
Butorac lost in the first round to Paul Hanley and Julian Knowle and Rojer lost in the semifinals to American Bob and Mike Bryan, who won the tournament defeating Oliver Marach and Filip Polášek 7–6(7–5), 6–3 in the final.

Seeds

Draw

Draw

External links
 Main draw

Doubles